Princess Leopoldina of Brazil (Leopoldina Teresa Francisca Carolina Miguela Gabriela Rafaela Gonzaga; 13 July 1847 – 7 February 1871) was the daughter of Emperor Pedro II and Empress Teresa Cristina. She shared the first name of her grandmother, Empress Maria Leopoldina of Brazil.

A Princess of Brazil from birth, Dona Leopoldina renounced her titles upon her marriage to Prince Ludwig August of Saxe-Coburg and Gotha, taking the title of Princess of Saxe-Coburg and Gotha and Duchess of Saxony.

The princess was also second in the line of succession to the Brazilian throne, even after the marriage of her older sister, Isabel, Princess Imperial of Brazil, due to the latter's difficulties in producing heirs. Her descendants would form the Braganza-Saxe-Coburg and Gotha branch of the Imperial House of Brazil.

Biography

Family and early years 
Leopoldina was born at 6:45 am on 13 July 1847, in the Imperial Palace of São Cristóvão, the second daughter of Pedro II and Teresa Cristina of the Two Sicilies. Her paternal grandparents were the Emperor Pedro I and Empress Maria Leopoldina, and her maternal grandparents were King Francis I of the Two Sicilies and Queen Maria Isabella.

She was baptized in the Cathedral and Imperial Chapel on 7 September 1847, by the bishop chief chaplain and diocesan gift Manuel do Monte Rodrigues de Araújo, Count of Irajá, and her name was given in honor of her paternal grandmother. Her godparents were her uncle and aunt, the Prince and Princess of Joinville—for which C. His de Buthenval, the minister plenipotentiary of Louis Philippe I of France, stood proxy—and Mariana Carlota de Verna Magalhães Coutinho, Countess of Belmonte and chief chamberlain of the Empress. From an early age, Pedro II sought to obtain a preceptor for his daughters. The choice fell on the Countess of Barral, indication of the Princess of Joinville, who began her functions in September 1855. Numerous teachers were instructed to educate the two young women, who followed an elaborate and rigorous system of studies constantly monitored by the Emperor.

The princesses attended classes six days a week, from 7 a.m. to 9:30 p.m. They could only receive visits on Sundays, at parties or on any other occasion determined by the Emperor. The subjects they studied were diverse: Portuguese and its Literature, French, English, Italian, German, Latin, Greek, Algebra, Geometry, Chemistry, Physics, Botany, History (whose subjects were divided by country and period), Cosmography, Drawing and Painting, Piano, Philosophy, Geography, Political economy, Rhetoric, Zoology, Mineralogy, and Geology.

Marriage 

Pedro II had commissioned Princess Francisca to find in Europe two young princes who could serve as consorts for his daughters. In the Speech from the Throne of May 1864, the sovereign announced the marriage of the princesses without, however, naming names of suitors. However, the two candidates chosen by the emperor—his nephew, Pierre, Duke of Penthièvre, and Philippe, Count of Flanders (son of Leopold I of Belgium)—refused the proposed consortium, leading the monarch to opt for the Princes Ludwig August of Saxe-Coburg and Gotha, the second son of August of Saxe-Coburg-Gota and Princess Clémentine of Orléans, and Gaston of Orléans, Count of Eu.

At first it was thought that Ludwig August was to be betrothed to the Princess Imperial and Gaston to Leopoldina, but Pedro II refused to proceed with the negotiations before hearing the opinion of his daughters about the suitors. On 2 September 1864, the princes arrived in Rio de Janeiro. In the days that followed, the initial plans were reversed, as Isabel recalled:

The union of Leopoldina and Ludwig August was settled through a marriage agreement between the Emperor of Brazil and the Duke of Saxe-Coburg and Gotha. The contract provided, in articles 3, 4 and 5 that, as long as Dom Pedro II did not consider Princess Isabel's succession assured, the couple should—among other things —reside part of the year in Brazil and have their children in Brazilian territory.

Finally, on 15 December 1864, Leopoldina married Ludwig August. The couple received a grant of 300:000$000 for the acquisition of a residence in Rio de Janeiro, from which they and their descendants would have the usufruct, but which would remain as national patrimony. The chosen property was a mansion next to the Palace of São Cristóvão, acquired in June 1865 and baptized as "Palace Leopoldina".

Ten months after suffering a miscarriage, Leopoldina gave birth on 19 March 1866, to the one who would become Dom Pedro II's favorite grandson, Prince Pedro Augusto. From then on, the Princess began to live between Brazil and Europe, always returning to her native land for the birth of her children. Thus it was with Augusto Leopoldo and José Fernando—born in 1867 and 1869, respectively. When she discovered she was pregnant with the fourth child, she and her husband decided that they would not return to Brazil, and on 15 September 1870, Prince Luís Gastão was born at Ebenthal Castle in Austria.

Death 
At the beginning of 1871, Leopoldina displayed the first symptoms of the disease that would kill her. The gastrointestinal problems and the fever, however, were not associated with the intake of contaminated water that plagued Vienna. In the second week, however, the princess was in a state of worrying prostration. The intermittent fever, the spots on the skin and the hematochezia, classic symptoms of typhoid fever, appeared in the fourth week. The picture evolved rapidly and Leopoldina began to suffer delusions and convulsions, a situation witnessed by Princess Isabel and the Count of Eu.

The princess eventually succumbed to the disease in the afternoon of 7 February 1871, at the age of 23. Clémentine of Orléans described the agony of her daughter-in-law in a letter sent to the Princess of Joinville:

In honor of the princess, Emperor Franz Joseph I of Austria decreed official mourning for 30 days. After the solemn funeral rites celebrated by the apostolic nuncio, Monsignor Mariano Falcinelli Antoniacci, her body was transferred to Coburg, where representatives of all the royal houses of Europe attended its burial. Her body rests in the crypt of St. Augustinkirche, next to the tombs of her husband and children. Every year, until 1922, masses in her memory were celebrated in Vienna.

Legacy 
The infertility of Princess Isabel, heir presumptive to the crown—who would give birth to a son only after more than ten years of marriage and almost four years after her sister's death—included Leopoldina's two eldest sons on the 2nd and 3rd positions in the line of succession to the Brazilian throne. After the death of their mother, the young princes were taken by their grandfather to be raised and educated in Brazil. This situation made the princess, although involuntarily, the founder of the cadet branch of Saxe-Coburg and Braganza. Pedro Augusto and Augusto Leopoldo would only be deprived of the succession in 1875, with the birth of Pedro de Alcântara, Prince of Grão-Pará.

Titles, styles, and honors

Titles and styles 
 13 July 1847 – 15 December 1864: Her Highness Princess Leopoldina of Brazil
 15 December 1864 – 7 February 1871: Her Royal Highness Princess Ludwig August of Saxe-Coburg and Gotha, Duchess of Saxony

Honors 
 Grand Cross of the Order of the Rose
 Grand Cross of the Imperial Order of San Carlos
 Dignitary of the Order of Queen Maria Luisa, 6 April 1863
 Dignitary of the Order of Saint Isabel
 Dignitary of the Order of the Starry Cross

Issue

Ancestry

References

Bibliography 
 Almanak Administrativo, Mercantil e Industrial da Corte e Província do Rio de Janeiro para o Anno de 1870 – Vigésimo-sétimo anno (Segunda série XX)
 Barman, Roderick J. Princess Isabel of Brazil: Gender and Power in the Nineteenth Century, U.S., Scholarly Resources Inc., 2002
 Bragança, Dom Carlos Tasso de Saxe-Coburgo e. A Princesa Leopoldina, in Revista do Instituto Histórico e Geográfico Brasileiro, vol. 243, 1959, p. 70-93 (ISSN 0101-4366)
 Bragança, Dom Carlos Tasso de Saxe-Coburgo e. Palácio Leopoldina, in Revista do Instituto Histórico e Geográfico Brasileiro, vol. 438, 2008, p. 281-303 (ISSN 0101-4366)
 Bragança, Dom Carlos Tasso de Saxe-Coburgo e. As confidências do Visconde de Itaúna a Dom Pedro II, in Revista do Instituto Histórico e Geográfico Brasileiro, vol. 424, 2004, p. 89-161 (ISSN 0101-4366)
 Defrance, Olivier. La Médicis des Cobourg, Clémentine d’Orléans, Bruxelles, Racine, 2007
 Del Priore, Mary. O Príncipe Maldito, Rio de Janeiro, Objetiva, 2007
 Filgueiras, Carlos A.L. A química na educação da Princesa Isabel, in Revista Química Nova, vol. 27, n° 2, São Paulo, março/abril 2004 (ISSN 0100-4042)
 Lessa, Clado Ribeiro de. O Segundo Ramo da Casa Imperial e a nossa Marinha de Guerra, in Revista do Instituto Histórico e Geográfico Brasileiro, vol. 211, 1951, p. 118-133 (ISSN 0101-4366)
 Wehrs, Carlos. A Princesa Leopoldina de Bragança e Bourbon e a Casa Ducal de Saxe-Coburg, in Revista do Instituto Histórico e Geográfico Brasileiro, vol. 437, 2007, p. 275-288 (ISSN 0101-4366)

External links 

1847 births
1871 deaths
Brazilian princesses
Deaths from typhoid fever
House of Braganza
People from Rio de Janeiro (city)
Princesses of Saxe-Coburg and Gotha
19th-century Brazilian people
Dames of the Order of Saint Isabel
Daughters of emperors